Torey is a given name, nickname and surname. Notable people with this name include the following:

Given name
 Torey Adamcik (born 1990), Perpetrator of the murder of Cassie Jo Stoddart
 Torey Defalco (born 1997), American volleyball player
 Torey Hunter (born 1972), American football player
 Torey Krug (born 1991), American ice hockey player
 Torey Malatia (born 1951), American journalist, radio producer, and public media manager
 Torey Pudwill (born 1990), American street skateboarder
 Torey Thomas (born 1985), American basketball player

Nickname
 Torey Lovullo, nickname of Salvatore Anthony Lovullo (born 1965), American baseball manager and coach
 Torey Hayden, nickname of Victoria Lynn Hayden, known as Torey L. Hayden (born 1951), American teacher, lecturer and writer

Surname
 Mike Torey (died 2013), Nigerian army officer

See also

 Toney (name)
 Torcy (disambiguation)
 Tore (disambiguation)
 Tori (name)
 Torre (name)
 Torrey (name)
 Tory (disambiguation)
 Tovey (disambiguation)
 Trey (disambiguation)
 Torny Pedersen